Haselbach is a river of Hesse, Germany. It is a right tributary of the Fulda near Rotenburg an der Fulda.

See also
List of rivers of Hesse

References

Rivers of Hesse
Rivers of Germany